Almat Maratuly Bekbayev (Almat Maratūly Bekbaev; born 14 June 1984) is a Kazakh football player who plays for Kyzylzhar as a goalkeeper, and the Kazakhstan.

Career

Club
In April 2014, Bekbayev signed for FC Aktobe, returning to FC Ordabasy in February 2016.

Bekbayev was released by FC Irtysh Pavlodar on 1 July 2018.

Career statistics

Club

International

Statistics accurate as of match played 1 June 2012

References

1984 births
Living people
Kazakhstani footballers
Kazakhstan international footballers
Kazakhstan Premier League players
FC Tobol players
FC Ordabasy players
FC Aktobe players
FC Kaisar players
FC Zhetysu players
FC Kyzylzhar players
People from Kyzylorda
Association football goalkeepers